Blepharita is a genus of moths of the family Noctuidae.

Species
 Blepharita amica (Treitschke, 1825)
 Blepharita dufayi Boursin, 1960
 Blepharita euplexina (Draudt, 1950)
 Blepharita flavistigma (Moore, 1867)
 Blepharita glenura (Swinhoe, 1895)
 Blepharita leucocyma (Hampson 1907)
 Blepharita niveiplaga (Walker, 1857)
 Blepharita timida (Staudinger, 1888)

References
 Blepharita at Markku Savela's Lepidoptera and Some Other Life Forms
 Natural History Museum Lepidoptera genus database

Cuculliinae
Moth genera